Olav Sepp (born 5 May 1969 in Tallinn) is an Estonian chess player and six-time champion of Estonia (1989, 1991–1995). Sepp also has several other top three finishes in the Estonian championship: 2nd in 1997, 3rd in 1998, 2nd in 1999 and 2000, 3rd in 2001, 3rd in 2005 (tied for 2nd but lost on tie-break), and 2nd in 2006 (tied for 1st but lost on tie-break).  He has represented Estonia in the Chess Olympiads six times: 1992, 1994, 1996, 2000, 2004, and 2006.

He received the chess titles of International Master in 1994 and International Correspondence Chess Master in 2018.

References

External links
 
 
 
 

1969 births
Living people
Estonian chess players
Chess International Masters
Chess Olympiad competitors
Sportspeople from Tallinn